The Women's 50 metre freestyle event at the 2010 Commonwealth Games took place on October 7 and 8 2010, at the SPM Swimming Pool Complex.

Six heats were held, with most containing the maximum number of swimmers (eight). The top sixteen advanced to the semifinals and the top eight from there qualified for the finals.

Heats summary

Semifinals

Semifinal 1

Semifinal 2

Final

References

External links

Aquatics at the 2010 Commonwealth Games
2010 in women's swimming
Commonwealth Games